Perheida is a genus of minute sea snails, marine gastropod mollusks or micromollusks in the family Pyramidellidae, the pyrams and their allies.

Species
 Perheida semenformis Peñas & Rolán, 2017

References

 Peñas A. & Rolán E. (2017). Deep water Pyramidelloidea from the central and South Pacific. The tribe Chrysallidini. ECIMAT (Estación de Ciencias Mariñas de Toralla), Universidade de Vigo. 412 pp.

External links
 

Pyramidellidae